Castle of the Masovian Dukes is a castle built in the fourteenth or fifteenth century by the Masovian Duke Siemowit III. The castle is located in Ciechanów, Masovian Voivodeship, in Poland.

History

The castle in Ciechanów was built on the turning point of the fourteenth and fifteenth century, with the assistance of Duke Janusz I. The towers located in the four corners of the castle's square formation help to defend the stronghold, and additional 10 metre high defensive walls. Due to dozens of reconstructions and expansions of the castle, the militaristic stronghold transformed into a royal residence. In the fifteenth century, the castle was raised by an additional level and a raised courtyard. In 1547, the stronghold changed its function into an aristocratic residence. It was the last period of the stronghold's glory. After the Third Partition of Poland, the stronghold became part of Prussia, and was partially deconstructed for cheap building material. In 1818, the castle was owned by the House of Krasiński, in the twentieth century the castle was fully rebuilt.

See also 
 Castles in Poland

References

Castles in Masovian Voivodeship
Ciechanów County
14th-century architecture